Major General Scott Alexander Winter,  is a senior officer in the Australian Army. He initially joined the Australian Army Reserve but, following training at the Australian Defence Force Academy and Royal Military College, Duntroon, was commissioned into the Royal Australian Armoured Corps. He has commanded the 1st Armoured Regiment (2011–14), Director Soldier Career Management – Army (2015–17) and 3rd Brigade (2017–19), and has deployed on operations to East Timor, Iraq and Afghanistan. He was appointed commander of the 1st Division in November 2021.

Military career
Winter was appointed a Member of the Order of Australia (AM) in the 2015 Australia Day Honours for "exceptional service through contributions to career management as the Senior Officer Manager – Army and to the development and modernisation of the Australian Army as the Commanding Officer 1st Armoured Regiment."

References

Alumni of King's College London
Australian generals
Australian military personnel of the International Force for East Timor
Australian military personnel of the Iraq War
Australian military personnel of the War in Afghanistan (2001–2021)
Deakin University alumni
Living people
Members of the Order of Australia
Officers of the Legion of Merit
Royal Military College, Duntroon graduates
University of New South Wales alumni
Year of birth missing (living people)